The William L. Coleman House, near Bedford, Kentucky, was listed on the National Register of Historic Places in 1983.

It was built in 1857 in Greek Revival style.  It is a two-story brick building with a two-story brick ell.  It was built by William L. Coleman, who served as a Confederate officer in the American Civil War.  The house, with accompanying farm, was acquired by the three Pierce brothers in 1870.

The listing included four contributing buildings and a contributing structure.

See also
Coleman House (Bedford, Kentucky), also listed on the National Register

References

National Register of Historic Places in Trimble County, Kentucky
Greek Revival houses in Kentucky
Houses completed in 1857
1857 establishments in Kentucky
Houses on the National Register of Historic Places in Kentucky
Houses in Trimble County, Kentucky